The 1999–2000 season in Dutch football was the 44th season in the Eredivisie. PSV Eindhoven won the title, while Roda JC won the Dutch National Cup.

Johan Cruijff-schaal

Eredivisie

Topscorers

PSV Winning Squad 1999-2000

Goal
 Ivica Kralj
 Patrick Lodewijks
 Ronald Waterreus

Defence
 Eric Addo
 Kasper Bøgelund
 Jürgen Dirkx
 Ernest Faber
 Jan Heintze
 Yuri Nikiforov
 André Ooijer
 Andrei Skerla

 Stan Valckx
 Chris van der Weerden
 Rob Wielaert

Midfield
 Mark van Bommel
 Wilfred Bouma
 Björn van der Doelen
 Tomek Iwan
 Dmitri Khokhlov
 Joonas Kolkka
 Dennis Rommedahl
 Ovidiu Stinga
 Johann Vogel

Attack
 Björn Becker
 Arnold Bruggink
 Luc Nilis
 Ruud van Nistelrooy
 Johan Pater

Management
 Eric Gerets (Coach)
 Ernie Brandts (Assistant)

Eerste Divisie

Promoted : NAC
Promotion / Relegation play-offs ("Nacompetitie") : FC Zwolle, FC Groningen, Excelsior, Emmen, RBC and Heracles

Promotion and relegation

Group A

Group B

Promoted : FC Groningen and RBC Roosendaal
Relegated : MVV Maastricht and Cambuur Leeuwarden

KNVB Cup

Dutch national team

References
 RSSSF Archive
 RDFC.com